Eggenberger may refer to:

Balthasar Eggenberger (died 1493), Austrian entrepreneur in the early days of mercantilism
Katrin Eggenberger (born 1982), a Swiss-Liechtensteiner academic and politician 
Rudolf Eggenberger (born 1946), Austrian football manager
Eggenberger Motorsport, Swiss motor racing team

See also

Eggenberg (disambiguation)
German toponymic surnames

Swiss-German surnames